Sekolah Kebangsaan Sungai Binjai (Jawi:سكوله كبڠسأن سوڠاي بينجاي), commonly known as SK Sungai Binjai or short, SKSB (or sometimes, Binjai), is a primary National School type situated at Batu 6, Pekan Meru, at the city of Klang and the state of Selangor. The name of the school, Sungai Binjai, literally translated in English as The River (Sungai) of the Malaysian Mango, taken from a river flowing nearby the school.

SK Sungai Binjai is the first and oldest school built in small town of Meru, in the Klang district, before the emergence of other schools such as SK Meru Jalan Tap, SK Meru (2) Jalan Paip, SK (1) Jalan Meru and SK (2) Jalan Meru.

In 2013, it was estimated around 1522 students (Year 1–3) in the evening session and 1746 (Preschool-Year 6) students in the morning session, making the total number of 3268 students altogether. There are a total of 91 classes (44 classes for evening session, 43 classes for morning session and 4 pre-school classes) altogetherJanuary 2013. The school is also currently divided into 2 sessions, the morning session is for pre-school and Level 2 pupils (Year 4 - Year 6), and the evening session for Level 1 pupils (Year 1 - Year 3). Both sessions are in the same administration, however the evening session is given to the Evening Senior Assistant/Evening Principal (Penolong Kanan Petang) to administer and to handle any official matters regarding the evening session teachers and pupils.

At SK Sungai Binjai there are 4 Pre-school classes located within the school compound. The classes are Pre Permata, Pre Berlian, Pre Intan and Pre Mutiara.

Currently the number of staff and teachers are approximately 188 people altogether (175 academic teachers and 13 supporting/non-academic staff)January 2013.

School Administration
The current Headmaster of SK Sungai Binjai is bapak kau, who started serving the school since 2017. Other administrators of the school include:

 Pn. Azizah Binti Noh - GPK Pentadbiran/Kurikulum (Sr. Asst. Curriculum/Administration)
 Pn. Maziah bt. Ismail - GPK Hal Ehwal Murid (Sr. Asst. Student Affairs)
 En. Husni bin Darus - GPK Ko-Kurikulum (Sr. Asst. Co-Curriculum)
 Pn. Halimatuz Saadiah bt. Yalinarambil - GPK Petang (Sr. Asst. Evening/Evening Principal)

The school mission and vision is to developing individual potential through quality education.

History
SK Sungai Binjai is a centenarian school (the school celebrates its 100th anniversary in 2017). One thing interesting to note is that although SK Sungai Binjai has gone through several phases of government (British Administration, Japanese Military Administration, returned to British administration and subsequent post-independence era), the state of the school and its surroundings have not changed much. Some say that SK Sungai Binjai was once used as a communist hideout, through the stories of the alumni who attended school around the 50s and 60s.

The Legendary River
The name "Sungai Binjai" originated from the Binjai trees that grows along the river. The fruit can be eaten and it can weighs up to a kilogram when it is matured enough. According to the mouth-to-mouth resources told by the elders of Kampung Meru, this exact river was the famous Malay folklore story Batu Belah Batu Bertangkup (The Split Boulder) originated, where the story of a mother who wanted to eat the eggs of a mudskipper, and end up being swallowed by a magical boulder after she ran away, frustrated at the expense of her son eaten her precious mudskipper eggs without her permission. She asked to be swallowed by the boulder herself and locked inside forever since. From that split boulder came the name Kampung Batu Belah, a rural village situated in Kapar. The first settlers of Kampung Meru mostly came from Kampung Batu Belah.

The Start (1917-1923)
It was said that the history of Sungai Binjai was older than Kampung Meru itself, and why this school was named after. 
This school was known earlier as Sungai Binjai Malay School. This school was first built by the locals of Kampung Meru (mostly Javanese settlers came from Batu Belah) in 1917 to meet the needs of the residents of Kampung Meru, at the city of Klang as to enable their children to get a proper education. On October 6, 1917, the school started with only 49 pupils. The founder and the first Headmaster, Abdul Karim b. Taari was the only teacher at that time serving the school. In 1917 the site of the original school was founded on the present site of SJK (Chinese) Tiong Hua Kok Bin and used until 1923.

The First Move (1923-1954)
In 1924 the school's name was changed to the Sekolah Kebangsaan Sungai Binjai and moved to the site of Pusat Kesihatan Meru (Meru Health Center) today. In 1924 a new school building was built on the Pipeline Road (Jalan Paip) about a quarter mile from the town of Meru. In this new school building, the situation was also similar to the old school. The increasing number of pupils from time to time, until it reached 105 pupils. The school was no longer suitable to be used for several reasons: the increased number of pupils and secondly, the school was frequently flooded during heavy rain. Obviously these matters were the reason of pupils studies had been interrupted for quite some time. Pupils of all levels were placed in a building without restrictions, and this situation lasted until 1954.

The Headmaster's residence was connected directly with the school building. Other teachers lived in quarters (3-doors detached houses) near the school. It was situated behind the school.

The Second Move/Recent Site (1954-now)
On the basis of the needs of the pupils, the school had moved to its current site in 1954, which is located not far from the original site and the second site.

Given the state of the school buildings are too old and the increasing number of students is too overwhelming, then the government had moved the school to a new site about 4  acres (previously owned by Tuan Hj. Ahmad Tafsir) of the site of the present school building. The school has its own shape and a distinct look, and it was officially used in 1955. The new school can accommodate a total enrollment of 500 pupils.

Unfortunately, the numbers of pupils keep on rising as years come. To solve the problem, the school was divided into 2 sessions (mornings and evenings) in 1964.

Official opening of the school was held on October 22, 1977, and was inaugurated by the then Chief Minister of Selangor YAB Dato' Seri Haji Hormat Bin Rafei, for opening the 1-storey buildings used for administrative purposes until 2010, where the school administration has now moved on new 2-storey detached buildings completed around 2010, replacing the dilapidated building that has been used since 1955. The old wooden building had been demolished on May 9, 2008.

Since October 2013, the new surau (Muslim prayer house) has started its construction and will be expected to be complete in the middle 2014.

Some images of the old buildings can still be seen in some blogs and Flicker owned by the old pupils of SK Sungai Binjai

The School's Infrastructures

Currently, there are six main buildings at SK Sungai Binjai. Each building was once named after the districts of Selangor. Nowadays buildings are easily identified by each letters assign to it. Buildings and infrastructures available in SK Sungai Binjai are:

1. Block A
 Classes for Year 3 and Year 6.
 Bistari Open Hall.

2. Block B 
 Staffroom (1st floor), J-Qaf room (Level 2) .
 Ground Floor - Conference Room, Quality Observation room/SPSK and School Office .

3. Block C 
 Classes for Year 1 Year 5 (7 classes), Year 6 and Year 2 (3 classes) .
 SPBT (Textbook Loan Scheme) Storeroom and bookstores.

4. Block D
 Level 1 - prayer room, SPBT Storeroom, 3 classes of Year 5 and 2, Prefectorial and Counseling Room (this room was the 1st School Office from 1970 to 2010, before moving to the Block B in 2010) .
 Ground floor - sports store room, Linus and BBM (teaching aid) room, the Resource Centre/Library, 1 Year 2 (shared with a Year 5 class) and the old staff room.

5. Block E
 Level 1 - the classes of Year 2 and Year 4, Lab/Science Room, PTA Access Center .
 Ground floor - Living Skills Workshop, "Permata Gemilang" special recovery class and Dental Clinic .

6. Block F
 Classes for Year 1 and Year 4.

In addition to the 6 main buildings, there are also buildings and other infrastructure areas such as Computer Lab, Pre-School, Stores/ Co-Curricular Activity Room, the school field, takraw/badminton, canteen and also a block for SK Sungai Binjai Staff Quarters.

List of Previous Headmasters and Chairman of the Parent-Teacher Association (PTA)

The honourable list of headmasters serving the school since 1917

The list of the previous PTA Chairman

The School Identity

The Emblem

The emblem was designed in 1966 by Tn. Haji Abdul Karim b. Ahmad, the 11th Headmaster of the school. The colour scheme used are blue, red and yellow, each had its own significant meaning on its own.

Blue - represents harmony and unity.
Red and Yellow - both representing the state of Selangor.
Book and torch - represent knowledge and progress.
Rice stalk - represent prosperity.

The motto Ilmu Suluh Kemajuan (Knowledge is the Torch of Progress) means that knowledge is important to everyone. It will become the torch that lightens the life to progress and to succeed.

The Flag
The flag is one of the main school identity used to honor the school in every rally held in both morning and evening session. The creators of this flag unknown, but the use of both Blue and Yellow each has its own meaning to it. It was said that the Yellow represents the royal colors, also symbolizing respect. Being pointed in triangle shape towards the Blue field symbolizes the respect towards harmony and unity of all citizens of SK Sungai Binjai.

The flag also had been brought to any activities that the school had represented and were used to be waived and shown whenever the school representative had won some of the competitions and activities.

Extra Curricular/Co-Academics Activities and Achievements
Basically, all co-curricular activities in SKSB only available for Level 2 (Year 4 - Year 5) pupils/students. Each and every pupils may choose any kinds of sports, uniformed bodies and co-academics clubs and associations that suit their interest.

Sports
SKSB participates in the Klang district level (MSSD Klang) and in the MSSS (Selangor School Sports Council) tournament at the state level. Among the sports that SKSB participates in are football, touch rugby, softball, netball, pingpong, tenpin bowling, sepak takraw, silat, handball, and athletics. SKSB is the defending champion in football and rugby at the district level. All team participating are in under-12 category.

Uniformed body
Uniformed body is compulsory for Level 2 (Year 4 - Year 5) students/pupils. Each pupils can only choose 1 uniformed body that they think suitable for their own self-interest. At SKSB, overall 5 uniformed bodies are offered for pupils to choose from. Some of these uniformed body are geared towards one gender, and some are fairly with both genders. Uniformed bodies available at SKSB are:
 Pengakap Kanak-Kanak/Cub Scouts
 Pandu Puteri Tunas/Brownie Guides - girls only
 Bulan Sabit Merah Malaysia
 Tunas Kadet Remaja Sekolah (TKRS)
 Persatuan Puteri Islam Malaysia (PPIM) - strictly only for Muslim girls.

Every Wednesday, pupils that involved in uniformed bodies are encouraged to wear their uniform in full-dress (aside with their normal school uniforms worn everyday)

Co-Academics
Besides co-curricular achievements, SKSB also had won in many co-academics competitions around district and states level. One of the most distinguished achievements is the Doktor Muda (Young Doctors) Team, who had won the 2013 Overall Champions in the Klang District level. Besides Doktor Muda, SKSB had won both district and states level in Malay language pantun, speech, story telling (level 1 and 2) and also syair.

SKSB also had been known in the MTQ (Majlis Tilawah Qur'an) arena, that the nasyid, tilawa Al-Qur'an, Islamic story telling and Qur'an memorizing (hafazan) team had placed less than 3rd each time competing in district level.

SKSB are known in the district of Klang to be one of the most active school to participate in almost everything offered. SKSB also are aiming to compete in English, Mathematics, Kajian Tempatan/Sivik (Local Studies/Civic), Sains (Science), Muzik (Music), Moral Studies, Kemahiran Hidup (Life Skills), J-Qaf (Jawi, Qur'an and basic Fardhu Ain) and Arabic Language, and also pre-school competitions held around Klang district.

The School Ethos
SKSB has several clubs, teams and groups that made the ethos or characters of the school in co-curricular achievements. These teams, clubs and groups had proven themselves several times in district, state and national level. SKSB's ethos are marching (Team Mujahid Kecil), nasyid (Harraz Generations), dikir barat (Wujdan), football/soccer (Sungai Binjai Football Club) and Kelab Doktor Muda (The Young Doctors Club, a school-based health promotional program between Ministry of Health and Ministry of Education).

SKSB Drill/Marching Team (Kawad Kaki)
SKSB Drill Team, once known as Pasukan Kawad Kaki/Team Mujahid Kecil (The Little Mujahids)  has made various district and state level for excellence since its inception in 2002. And has been a champion at the national level around the year 2005–2013. This team focused on marching and drill exercise such as formation, static and dynamic drill.

SKSB's Nasyid Team
Established in 2008, this nasyid group is well known in the Klang district as one of the most active groups available. This group had won several titles in the MTQ (Majlis Tilawah Al-Quran), The Primary School Nasyid Festival and other nasyid-related competition in district, state and national levels organized by the Ministry of Education or the State Education Department. They had also entered private competitions outside of the school and emerged as champions in those competitions.

SKSB's Dikir Barat Team
This special dikir barat team had been established in 2013 for the purpose of entering the Klang District's Arabic Language Competition. Eventually, this unique team had taken the attraction of many people because of their dikir barat songs are mainly sung in Arabic. Because of that uniqueness, the team had been briefly called by Malaysia's TV9 to join in as their opening and midsection of the semi-religious program Rasul Yang Kata (The Prophet Said).

Sungai Binjai Football Club (SBFC)
This football club had been established in 2014 in order to compete in 1 Malaysia Cardiff City Cup, in Under-12 category. Placed in Division 2 of the league, it had a good start and now (until March 2014), this team is placed 4th among 16 teams competed in the Klang Valley Zone. This team also served as the representative team of SKSB in district, state and national levels organized by the Ministry of Education.

Junior Doctors Club (Kelab Doktor Muda)
Doktor Muda started in 1989 and officially recognized by the Ministry of Education in 2006 and granted the status of the program as a club. In SKSB, Doktor muda had many successful achievements from districts to national levels. It was awarded The Most Active Club at the national in 2013, after it was awarded the Best Doktor Muda Club in 2012 and 2013 in district and state level. The numbers of passing on the Doktor Muda examination is also the highest in Klang districts, where average 85% of the candidates passed the exams to become a Doktor Muda.

Trivia
 In March 2013, the SKSB's LINUS Programme class had been selected to be shown and aired by TV9's Nasi Lemak Kopi O, because of the 100% success of the LINUS Programme.
 It is said that SK Sungai Binjai is (or probably was) the record holder for being the most compact and the most populated primary school in Selangor. For the record, the school that holds the current record for being the most compact and the most populated school in Malaysia is Sekolah Menengah Kebangsaan Meru (SMK Meru), estimated about 4510 students and 226 teachers 2012.
 In 2011, Nurdini Mohamad Ali, a Year 5 pupil was found dead after breaking the Ramadhan fast with her family. It was suspected that she died of food poisoning coming from the food that she bought previously at the Meru Ramadhan Bazaar

School Address
Contact:
Sekolah Kebangsaan Sungai Binjai
Batu 6, Pekan Meru
41050, Selangor
Malaysia.
Telefon - 03-33921048
Fax - 03-33921048

SKSB in Malaysian Mass Media
 Kisah SK Sungai Binjai - 2007
 Kisah SK Sungai Binjai - 2007
 Anugerah Kecermelangan Kokurikulum 2007
 Kem Kepimpinan SK Sungai Binjai 1999
 Dutch Lady Cabaran Sekolahku Generasi Membina, laporan sekolah
 Dutch Lady Cabaran Sekolahku Generasi Membina, laporan sekolah.
 Dutch Lady Cabaran Sekolahku Generasi Membina, tempat ke-2
 Platun SK Sungai Binjai Kembali Berkuasa (Sinar Harian)
 SK Sungai Binjai Johan Kawad Kaki Kebangsaan
 Peronda Denggi SKSB

References

Primary schools in Malaysia
Educational institutions established in 1917
1917 establishments in British Malaya
Publicly funded schools in Malaysia